Hugh Vernon "Pat" Richter (born September 9, 1941) is the former University of Wisconsin–Madison athletic director and American football player. He was responsible for hiring Barry Alvarez from Notre Dame in 1990 as head football coach, restoring the Badgers football program to national prominence. He also hired basketball coaches Dick Bennett and Bo Ryan, both of whom reached the "Final Four" of the NCAA Tournament.

Playing career
Richter was a nine-time letterman at the University of Wisconsin-Madison (the last person to earn such a distinction in school history). He lettered three times each in football, basketball, and baseball. He earned All-America (1961–62) and academic All-America (1962) honors as a tight end, led the Big Ten in receiving twice, and led the nation in receiving yards as a junior. Richter set a Rose Bowl record with 11 catches for 163 yards in the 1963 game vs. No. 1-rated USC Trojans. He also earned all-league honors in baseball as a first baseman. In 1963, he was awarded the Big Ten Medal of Honor, which recognizes one student from the graduating class of each Big Ten member school, for demonstrating joint athletic and academic excellence throughout their college career.

He was a first round draft pick of the Washington Redskins in the 1963 NFL Draft and went on to play eight seasons in Washington.

Athletic director
Richter returned to the University of Wisconsin–Madison as athletic director in 1989 after 17 years service as Vice President of Personnel at Oscar Mayer Foods Corp., recruited by then-chancellor Donna Shalala.  He inherited a program in disarray, with outmoded facilities, struggling teams, and a deficit of $2.1 million.

He made a priority of modernizing the sports facilities, including construction of the Kohl Center and renovations to Camp Randall Stadium.  He reversed the financial fortunes of the department, erasing the deficit and building a budget reserve of $6.4 million.

When he stepped down as athletic director on April 1, 2004, he was the longest-tenured director of athletics in the Big Ten Conference with 14-plus years.  He was succeeded by Alvarez.

Legacy
Richter is a member of the College Football Hall of Fame, the Academic All-America Hall of Fame, the Rose Bowl Hall of Fame and the Wisconsin Athletic Hall of Fame.  He was named to Sports Illustrated's NCAA Football All-Century Team.

Richter is a member of  The Pigskin Club of Washington, D.C.  National Intercollegiate All-American Football Players Honor Roll.

The University of Wisconsin–Madison twice honored Richter during the 2006 football season.  On November 4, his number 88 was retired in a ceremony during that day's football game.  On November 17 a bronze statue of Richter was unveiled in the Kellner Hall plaza immediately outside Camp Randall Stadium.

References

External links
"The Richter Era" from the University of Wisconsin–Madison Badgers website
Pat Richter's professional stats

1941 births
Living people
Washington Redskins players
Wisconsin Badgers athletic directors
Wisconsin Badgers baseball players
Wisconsin Badgers football players
Wisconsin Badgers men's basketball players
All-American college football players
College Football Hall of Fame inductees
Parade High School All-Americans (boys' basketball)
Sportspeople from Madison, Wisconsin
Players of American football from Wisconsin
Baseball players from Wisconsin
Basketball players from Wisconsin
American men's basketball players
Madison East High School alumni